Al Paul Hamilton Greene (born 5 May 1978) is a Gibraltarian former footballer who most notably played as a forward for Glacis United, as well as various spells in the lower leagues of Spain. Towards the end of his career, he also turned out for Lions Gibraltar and St Joseph's, as well as representing the Gibraltar national football team once after they joined UEFA.

Club career
Starting his career in Gibraltar with St Theresa's FC, Greene had two spells at Spanish club Linense, as well as three spells at Glacis United during his career. In 2016 he joined Lions Gibraltar. Although he was used primarily as a defender, he became a regular feature in the side. He left the club aged 40 in July 2018, but announced his intention to keep playing. On 6 August 2018, he joined St Joseph's.

International career
Greene made his international debut with Gibraltar, at the age of 35, on 19 November 2013 in a 0–0 home draw with Slovakia. This was Gibraltar's first game since being admitted to UEFA. This would prove to be his only cap for Gibraltar as a UEFA association.

References

1978 births
Living people
Association football forwards
Gibraltarian footballers
Gibraltar international footballers
Glacis United F.C. players
Lions Gibraltar F.C. players
St Joseph's F.C. players
Gibraltar Premier Division players